Kristinn Pálsson (born 17 December 1997) is an Icelandic basketball player who plays for Aris Leeuwarden of the BNXT League and the Icelandic national team.

Basketball career

Early career
Kristinn started playing basketball with the junior teams of Njarðvík at the age of 6. He played his first senior games with its reserve team in the Icelandic Cup during the 2011–12 and 2012–13 seasons. During the summer of 2013, he signed with A.S. Stella Azzurra to play for its junior team program.

College career
After two seasons with Stella Azzurra, Kristinn joined Marist College in 2015. During his freshman season, he averaged 8.7 points and 4.4 rebounds. In December 2017, during his junior season, he announced that he was leaving the school due to a death in his family.

Return to Iceland
In January 2018, Kristinn returned to Iceland and intended to join his hometown team of Njarðvík. However, after three games FIBA revoked his playing license as Stella Azzurra was demanding compensation due to him being a member of their team when he turned 18-years old. Although he played for Njarðvík's juniors teams from the age of 6 to 16, FIBA agreed with Azzurra and Njarðvík was forced to pay a 9,600 euros in compensation.

In May 2020, Kristinn signed with Grindavík. On 29 April 2021, he scored a game winning three pointer at the buzzer against ÍR. For the season, he averaged 12.2 points, 6.4 rebounds and 3.1 assists.

Netherlands 
On 24 June 2022, Kristinn signed with Dutch club Aris Leeuwarden of the BNXT League.

National team career
Kristinn debuted with the Icelandic national team in 2017.

Personal life
Kristinn's father is former national team player Páll Kristinsson.

References

External links
Icelandic statistics at Icelandic Basketball Association
Proballers.com profile
Marist profile

1997 births
Living people
Aris Leeuwarden players
Guards (basketball)
Kristinn Pálsson
Kristinn Pálsson
Kristinn Pálsson
Kristinn Pálsson
Marist Red Foxes men's basketball players
Kristinn Pálsson
Kristinn Pálsson